Breaking glass is the action of damaging or destroying a glass object. It may also refer to:

Arts and media

Film and television
 Breaking Glass, a 1980 musical film starring Hazel O'Connor 
 "Breaking Glass", a 2005 episode of MythBusters
 Breaking Glass (Once Upon a Time), an episode of the TV series Once Upon a Time

Music
 "Breaking Glass" (song), a song by David Bowie
 Breaking Glass (album), a 1980 album by Hazel O'Connor
 "I Love the Sound of Breaking Glass", a 1978 single by Nick Lowe
 "Breaking Glass", a song by Baboon from their 2006 self-titled album

Other media
 Breaking Glass Press, an independent press run by the Alternative Media Project

Rituals
 Breaking the glass, a Jewish wedding ritual
 Plate smashing in Greek celebrations, where glasses and plates are thrown to the ground

See also 
 Broken Glass (disambiguation)
 Shattered Glass (disambiguation)
 Safety glass, a group of materials designed to minimize risk of injury caused by breakage
 Glassing, use of broken glass as a weapon